The Insolvency and Bankruptcy Code, 2016 (IBC) is an Indian law which creates a consolidated framework that governs insolvency and bankruptcy proceedings for companies, partnership firms, and individuals.

Background 
Prior to the IBC, the legislative framework for insolvency and restructuring was fragmented across multiple legislations, such as the Companies Act 2013, the Sick Industrial Companies (Special Provisions) Act, 1985, Securitization and Reconstruction of Financial Assets and Enforcement of Security Interest Act, 2002, the Recovery of Debts due to Banks and Financial Institutions Act (RDDBFI Act), 1993, and others.

History
On 22 August 2014, the Ministry of Finance created the Bankruptcy Legislative Reforms Committee (BLRC). The committee was headed by T. K. Viswanathan, and tasked with drafting a new bankruptcy law. The Committee submitted its report, which included a draft bill, on 4 November 2015. A modified version of the draft bill, after the incorporation of public comments, was introduced in the Sixteenth Lok Sabha Lok Sabha by Finance Minister Arun Jaitley as the Insolvency and Bankruptcy Code, 2015.  The bill was tabled on 23 December 2015. A Joint Parliamentary Committee on the Insolvency and Bankruptcy Code, 2015 (JPC) was set up and the bill was referred to it for detailed analysis.  The JPC submitted its report, which included a new draft of the Bill, 28 April 2016. It was passed by the Lok Sabha on 5 May 2016, and by the Rajya Sabha on 11 May 2016. Subsequently, it received assent from President Pranab Mukherjee and was notified in The Gazette of India on 28 May 2016.

Early cases 
The first insolvency resolution order under this code was passed by National Company Law Tribunal (NCLT) in the case of Synergies-Dooray Automotive Ltd on 14 August 2017. The plea for insolvency was submitted by company on 23 January 2017. The resolution plan was submitted to NCLT within a period of 180 days as required by the code, and the approval for the same was received on 2 August 2017 from the tribunal. The final order was uploaded on 14 August 2017 on the NCLT website.

Key Provisions
Insolvency Resolution : The Code outlines separate insolvency resolution processes for individuals, companies and partnership firms. The process may be initiated by either the debtor or the creditors. A maximum time limit, for completion of the insolvency resolution process, has been set for corporates and individuals. For companies, the process will have to be completed in 180 days, which may be extended by 90 days, if a majority of the creditors agree. For start ups (other than partnership firms), small companies and other companies (with asset less than Rs. 1 crore), resolution process would be completed within 90 days of initiation of request which may be extended by 45 days.

The Insolvency and Bankruptcy Code (Amendment) Act, 2019 has increased the mandatory upper Time limit of 330 days including time spent in legal process to complete resolution process.

Insolvency regulator: The Code establishes the Insolvency and Bankruptcy Board of India, to oversee the insolvency proceedings in the country and regulate the entities registered under it. The Board will have 10 members, including representatives from the Ministries of Finance and Law, and the Reserve Bank of India.

Insolvency professionals: The insolvency process will be managed by licensed professionals. These professionals will also control the assets of the debtor during the insolvency process.

Bankruptcy and Insolvency Adjudicator: The Code proposes two separate tribunals to oversee the process of insolvency resolution, for individuals and companies: (i) the National Company Law Tribunal for Companies and Limited Liability Partnership firms; and (ii) the Debt Recovery Tribunal for individuals and partnerships.

Procedure

Time Limit 
The IBC envisions that the entire CIRP process must take place within 180 days of the admission of the application. A CIRP must be mandatorily completed within 330 days, including any extension or litigation period.

Initiating the CIRP 
In the case of a corporate debtor, an application for insolvency proceedings must be submitted to the Adjudicating Authority (AA), which is the NCLT. The application may be filed by a financial creditor (Section 7), an operational creditor (Section 9), or the corporate debtor (Section 10) itself. Section 11 enumerates the persons not entitled to make an application, such as corporate debtor who was in a CIRP at the time of the application, or had been in one recently.

The maximum time allowed to consider the application is 14 days. If the application is allowed, the AA: (i) declares a moratorium; (ii) causes a public announcement of the CIRP process and calls for the submission of claims; and (iii) appoints an Interim Resolution Professional (IRP).

Moratorium 
On the date on which the insolvency commences, a moratorium is declared, and it remains in force until the end of the CIRP. The CIRP ends, either when the AA approves a resolution plan under Section 31(1), or when it passes a liquidation order under Section 33. The moratorium ensures that the CIRP has a free-rein and is the only mechanism through which claims are settled. It bars the institution of litigation against the corporate debtor, while at the same time suspending the corporate debtor's ability to move, sell, or transfer any of its assets. It bars actions both by and against the corporate debtor. However, the moratorium has certain exceptions, such as Section 14(2A), which allows the IRP to continue to supply of such goods and services as it considers necessary to preserve the value of the corporate debtor.

For the said period, the board of directors of the company stands suspended, and the promoters do not have a say in the management of the company. The IRP, if required, can seek the support of the company's management for day-to-day operations. If the CIRP fails in reviving the company, the liquidation process is initiated.

Amendments
 2017 Amendment prohibits certain persons from submitting a resolution plan in case of defaults. These include: (i) wilful defaulters, (ii) promoters or management of the company if it has an outstanding non-performing debt for over a year, and (iii) disqualified directors, among others.  Further, it bars the sale of property of a defaulter to such persons during liquidation.

High-value cases

References

External links
Insolvency and Bankruptcy Code, 2016
 Rules and Regulations
 Official website of Insolvency and Bankruptcy Board of India (IBBI) 

Acts of the Parliament of India 2016
Insolvency law by country
Financial regulation in India
2016 in Indian economy
Bankruptcy
Modi administration